Forest Park is an unincorporated community in Otsego Township, Steuben County, in the U.S. state of Indiana.

Geography

References

Unincorporated communities in Steuben County, Indiana
Unincorporated communities in Indiana